Handley is a civil parish in Cheshire West and Chester, England.  It contains seven buildings that are recorded in the National Heritage List for England as designated listed buildings.  Two of these are listed at Grade II*, the middle grade, and the rest are at the lowest grade, Grade II.  The parish contains the villages of Handley and Milton Green, and is otherwise entirely rural.  The listed buildings are all domestic, apart from a church.

Key

Buildings

See also
Listed buildings in Aldersey
Listed buildings in Aldford
Listed buildings in Chowley
Listed buildings in Coddington
Listed buildings in Golborne David
Listed buildings in Saighton
Listed buildings in Tattenhall

References
Citations

Sources

Listed buildings in Cheshire West and Chester
Lists of listed buildings in Cheshire